This is a list of senior high schools in Alberta accredited by Alberta Education. The listed schools include public, separate, private and charter high schools, as well as all other organizations accredited to teach high school courses, including outreach schools, adult education schools, distant learning and homeschooling coordination centres, and coordination centres for in place education of hospitalized or incarcerated students. Senior high school in Alberta includes grades 10 to 12.

A
Acme
  Acme School
Airdrie
  Airdrie Francophone School
  Airdrie Koinonia Christian School
  Airdrie Learning Connection
  Bert Church High School
  George McDougall High School
  Rocky View Schools Online
  St Martin de Porres School
  W. H. Croxford High School
Alix
  Alix (Mirror and Alix Central)
Altario
  Altario School
Andrew
  Andrew School
Anzac
  Bill Woodward School
Ardrossan
  Ardrossan Junior Senior High School
Ashmont
  Ashmont Secondary Community School
Athabasca
  Centre for Alternative and Virtual Education
  Edwin Parr Composite Community School
Atikameg
  Whitefish Lake First Nation School

B
Banff
  Banff Community High School
Barrhead
  Alberta Distance Learning Centre
  Barrhead Composite High School
  Barrhead Outreach School
  Vista Virtual School (locations in Barrhead, Calgary, Edmonton, and Lethbridge)
Bashaw
  Bashaw School
Bassano
  Bassano School
Bawlf
Bawlf School
Beaumont
 Ecole Secondaire Beaumont Composite High School
  Black Gold Outreach School
Beaverlodge
  Beaverlodge Regional High School
Beiseker
  Beiseker Community School
  West Haven Colony School
Bentley
  Bentley School
Black Diamond
  Education Plus - Diamond Valley
  Oilfields High School
Bonnyville
  Bonnyville Centralized High School 
  Bonnyville Outreach
  Ecole des Beaux-Lacs
  Ecole Notre Dame High School 
Bow Island
  Cherry Coulee Christian Academy
  Senator Gershaw School
  St Michaels School
Bowden
  Bowden (Grandview) School
Boyle
  Boyle School
Brant
  Brant Christian School
Breton
  Breton High School
Brocket
  Piikani Nation Secondary School
Brooks
  Brooks Composite High School
  Ecole Le Ruisseau
  Newell Christian School
  St Joseph's Collegiate
  St. Luke's Outreach Centre
  Sunrise School
Buck Lake
  Buck Mountain Central School
  Buck Mountain Outreach Program

C
Cadotte Lake
  Cadotte Lake School
  Little Buffalo School
Calgary
  AADAC Youth Services
  Access International College (Calgary) Inc.
  Alberta Chung Wah School
  All Saints High School
  Alternative High School
  Aurora Learning Calgary
  Asasa Academy
  Banbury Crossroads School
  Bearspaw Christian School & College
  Bethel Christian Academy
  Bishop Carroll High School
  Bishop McNally High School
  Bishop O'Byrne High School
  Bowness High School
  Calgary Academy
  Calgary Academy Collegiate
  Calgary Chinese Private School
  Calgary Chinese Alliance School
  Calgary Christian High School
Calgary French & International School
  Calgary Home Education
  Calgary Islamic Private School
  Calgary Quest School
  CBe-learn Online School (at Ernest Manning High)
  Centennial High School
  Central Memorial High School
  Chestermere High School
  Chinook Learning Services
  Chinook Winds Adventist Academy
  Christine Meikle School
  Clear Water Academy
  Crescent Heights High School
  Cultural Centre Chinese Learning Academy
  Delta West Academy
  Discovering Choices
  Discovering Choices 2
  Dr. E.P. Scarlett High School
  Dr. Gordon Townsend School
  Eastside Christian Academy
  Ernest Manning High School
  École de la Rose Sauvage
  École Ste Marguerite Bourgeoys
  Edge School
  Father Lacombe High School
  FFCA High School Campus
  Foothills Academy
  Forest Lawn High School
  Fresh Start Outreach Program
  Green Learning Academy
  Greek Community School
  Henry Wise Wood High School
  Heritage Christian Academy
  International School of Excellence
  Jack James High School
  James Fowler High School
  Janus Academy (Holy Cross Site)
  Joane Cardinal-Schubert High School
  John G. Diefenbaker High School
  Juno Beach Academy of Canadian Studies
  Lester B. Pearson High School
  Lord Beaverbrook High School
  Louise Dean School
  Lycée Louis Pasteur
  Master's College
  Mountain View Academy
  National Sport School
  New Heights School and Learning Services
  Nelson Mandela High School
  Notre Dame High School
  Our Lady of Lourdes
  Our Lady of the Rockies High School
  Phoenix Home Education Foundation Centre
  Project Trust
  Queen Elizabeth High School
  Renert School
  Robert Thirsk School
  Rundle College Academy
  Rundle College Senior High School
  St. Anne Academic Centre
  Saint Francis High School
  St. Mary's High School
  Sanctuary Outreach
  Sir Winston Churchill High School
  Springbank Community High School
  Start Outreach
  The Chinese Academy
  The School of Alberta Ballet
  The Third Academy
  Third Academy Calgary South
  Tsuu T'ina Bullhead Adult Education Centre
  Tyndale Christian School
  Webber Academy
  West Island College
  West View School
  Westbrook Outreach
  Western Canada High School
  Westmount Charter School
  William Aberhart High School
  William Roper Hull School
  Wood's Homes School
  Young Adult Program
  Yufeng Chinese School
Calling Lake
  Calling Lake School
Calmar
  Calmar Secondary School
Camrose
  Battle River Online School
  Battle River Home Schools
  Camrose Composite High School
  Learning Together Outreach Program
  Our Lady of Mount Pleasant Catholic School
  P A C E Outreach High School
Canmore
  Canadian Rockies Education Outreach
  Canmore Collegiate High School
  École Notre-Dame des Monts
  Our Lady of the Snows Catholic Academy
Cardston
  Big Bend Colony School
  Cardston High School
  East Cardston Colony School
  Kainai High School
  Red Crow Community College
  Standoff Colony School
  St. Kateri Catholic School
  Westwind Alternate School
Carmangay
  Carmangay Outreach
Caroline
  Caroline School
Carstairs
  Hugh Sutherland School
Caslan
  Crossroads Outreach School
Castor
  Gus Wetter School
  Castor Outreach School
Cayley
  Cayley Colony School
Cessford
  Berry Creek Community School
Champion
  Hope Christian School
Chateh
  Dene Tha' Community School
Chauvin
  Dr. Folkins Community School
Chestermere
  Chestermere Learning Connection
  St. Gabriel the Archangel
Claresholm
  Little Bow Colony School
  Livingstone Range Outreach - North
  Willow Creek Composite High School
Coaldale
  Kate Andrews High School
  Pass+
Coalhurst
  Calvin Christian School
  Coalhurst High School
Cochrane
  Bow Valley High School
  Cochrane High School
  Cochrane Learning Connection
  St. Timothy High School
Cold Lake
  Assumption Junior Senior High School
  Cold Lake High School
  Cold Lake Outreach
  École Voyageur
  Fishing Lake Outreach Program
  Lakeland Christian Academy
  Trinity Christian School Association
Coleman
  Crowsnest Consolidated High School
  Outreach West
Condor
  David Thompson School
Consort
  Consort School
Coronation 
  Coronation Outreach School
  Coronation School
Cremona
  Cremona School
Crooked Creek
  Crooked Creek Colony School
  Ridgevalley School
Crossfield
  Fairview Colony School
  W. G. Murdoch High School

D
Daysland
  Daysland School
Delburne
  Delburne Centralized School
Delia
  Delia School
Devon
  John Maland High School
Dewberry
  Dewberry School
  Students On Line
Didsbury
  Didsbury High School
  Didsbury Career High School
  Northstar Academy - Canada
Donnelly
  Georges P. Vanier School
Drayton Valley
  Frank Maddock High School
  Drayton Valley Community Outreach School
  Holy Trinity Academy
Drumheller
  Drumheller Outreach School
  Drumheller Valley Secondary School
  St. Anthony's School
  St. Luke's Outreach Centre Drumheller
Duchess
  Duchess School
Dunmore
Eagle Butte High School

E
Eaglesham
  Birch Meadows Colony School
  Eaglesham School
Eckville
  Eckville Junior Senior High School
Eden Valley
  Chief Jacob Bearspaw School
Edgerton
  Edgerton Public School
Edmonton
  Alberta Health Services Intensive Day Treatment Youth Program
  Alberta Health Services Youth Residential Treatment Centre
  Alberta International College
  Alberta School for the Deaf
  Amiskwaciy Academy Senior High School
  Archbishop MacDonald High School
  Archbishop O'Leary Catholic High School
  Archbishop Oscar Romero
  Alternative Education
  Argyll Home School Centre
  Aspen Program (severe oppositional defiant disorder, in High Park School)
  Aurora Learning Foundation
  Austin O'Brien
  Boyle Street Education Centre
  Braemar School
  Canadian Collegiate Institute
  Centre High Outreach
  Columbus Academy
  Coralwood Adventist Academy
  Commonwealth International Academy
  Eastglen Senior High School
  J H Picard 
  École Maurice-Lavallée
  École publique Gabrielle-Roy
  Edmonton Academy
  Edmonton Christian High School
  Edmonton Islamic Academy
  Elves Child Development Centre
  Fresh Start Cardinal Collins
  Fresh Start Millwoods
  Fresh Start Westmount Academic Centre
  Harry Ainlay School
  Headway School Society of Alberta
  Holy Trinity
  Hospital School Campuses
  Inner City High School
  Institutional Services Schools
  J. Percy Page High School
  Jasper Place Composite High School
  L. Y. Cairns High School (mild cognitive disability)
  Learning Store at Blue Quill
  Learning Store at Circle Square
  Learning Store at Londonderry
  Learning Store West Edmonton
  Learning Store on Whyte
  Lillian Osborne High School
  Louis St. Laurent School
  M.E. LaZerte High School
  McNally High School
  Metro Continuing Education
  Millwoods Christian School
  Mother Margaret Mary Catholic High School
  Norwood Chinese School
  Old Scona School
  Parkland Immanuel Christian School
  Partners for Youth
  Phoenix Academy
  Progressive Academy
  Queen Elizabeth High School
  Revelation On-Line
  Rosecrest School
  Ross Sheppard High School
  Solomon College
  St. Francis Xavier
  St. Joseph High School
  Strathcona Composite High School
  Tempo School
  The Academy at King Edward
  Thomas More Academy
  Transitions at the Y
  Victoria School
  Victory Christian School
  Vimy Ridge Academy
  W.P. Wagner High School
  Yellowhead Tribal Education Centre
 Edson
  Holy Redeemer Junior Senior Catholic High School
  Parkland Composite High School
  The Learning Connection - Edson
  Yellowhead Koinonia Christian School
Elk Point
  Elk Point Outreach
  F. G. Miller Junior Senior High School
Enoch
  Kitaskinaw School
Evansburg
  Grand Trunk High School
  The Learning Connection - Evansburg

F
Fairview
  Fairview and Area Learning Store
  Fairview High School
  St Thomas More Catholic School
Falher
  École Heritage
Falun
  Pigeon Lake Regional School
Foremost
  Foremost School
Ferintosh
  Silver Creek School
Foremost
  Foremost School
Forestburg
  Forestburg School
Fort Chipewyan
  Athabasca Delta Community School
Fort Macleod
  F P Walshe High School
  Walshe Crossroads Campus
Fort McMurray
  École Boréal
  Father Patrick Mercredi Community High School
  Fort McMurray Composite High School
  Frank Spragins High School
  Holy Trinity Catholic High School
  Westwood Community High School
Fort Saskatchewan
  Fort Saskatchewan High School
  Fort Saskatchewan Next Step II Outreach School
  St. John Paul II Catholic High School
Fort Vermilion
  Chief Tallcree School North
  Fort Vermilion Outreach Program
  Fort Vermilion Public School
  Rocky Lane School
Fox Creek
  Fox Creek School
  Fox Creek Talent Developmental Centre
Fox Lake
  Jean Baptiste Sewepagaham School
Frog Lake
  Chief Napeweaw Comprehensive School

G
Garden River
  Sister Gloria School
Gibbons
  Sturgeon Learning Centre
Glendon
  Glendon School
Glenevis
  Alexis Elementary Junior Senior High School
Grande Cache
Grande Cache Community High School
  The Learning Connection - Grande Cache
Grande Prairie
  Bridge Network
  Crystal Park School
  École Nouvelle Frontière
  Grande Prairie Composite High School
  Grande Prairie Public School District #2357 Home Schooling
  Grandview Colony School
  Hillcrest Christian School
  Peace Wapiti Academy
  St. John Bosco Catholic School
  St. Joseph Catholic High School
Grassland
  Grassland Community School
Grassy Lake
  Arden T. Litt Centre for Learning
Grimshaw
  Grimshaw Junior Senior High School

H
Hanna
  J C Charyk Hanna School

Hay Lakes
  Hay Lakes School
Heinsburg
  Heinsburg Community School
High Level
  High Level Learning Store
  High Level Public School
High Prairie
  E. W. Pratt High School
  Prairie View Outreach School
  St. Andrew's School
  Harry Ainlay Edmonton
  St. Francis Holistic Learning Centre
High River
  École Secondaire Highwood High School
  Education Plus High River
  Notre Dame Collegiate 
  St. Luke's Outreach Centre High River
Hines Creek
  Hines Creek Composite School
Hinton
  Gerard Redmond Community Catholic School
  Harry Collinge High School
  The Learning Connection - Hinton
Hughenden
  Hughenden Public School

I
Innisfail
  École Innisfail Junior Senior High School
  Grimmon House
  Innisfail Career High School
Innisfree
  Delnorte School
Irma
  Irma School
Irricana
  Tschetter Colony School

J
Jasper
  École Desrochers
  Jasper Junior Senior High School
John D'Or Prairie
  John D'Or Prairie School

K
Keg River
  Dr Mary Jackson School (named after Dr. Mary Percy Jackson)
Kehewin
  Kehewin Community Education Centre
Kingman
  Cornerstone Christian Academy
Kinuso
  Kinuso Outreach Program
  Kinuso School
  Swan River School
Kitscoty
  Kitscoty Junior Senior High School

L
La Crete
  La Crete Public School
  La Crete Outreach Program
  Northern Outreach Center
Lac La Biche
  Amisk Community School
  J. A. Williams High School
  Journeys Learning Academy
  Lac La Biche Outreach
  Youth Assessment Centre
Lacombe
  Central Alberta Christian High School
  Lacombe Outreach School
  Ecole Secondaire Lacombe Composite High School 
  Parkview Adventist Academy
  Prairie Adventist Christian eSchool
  The First Step Adult Education Center
  Wolf Creek Academy
Lamont
  Lamont High School
Leduc
  Black Gold Outreach School
  Christ the King Junior Senior High School
  Leduc Composite High School
  STAR Catholic Outreach School
Lethbridge
  Catholic Central High School
  Chinook High School
  École La Vérendrye
  Immanuel Christian High School
  Lethbridge Collegiate Institute
  Palliser Home Learning School
  Pitawani School
  Stafford Ridge School
  Trinity Learning Centre
  Victoria Park High School
  Winston Churchill High School
Lloydminster
  Avery Outreach School
  Holy Rosary High School
  Lloydminster Comprehensive High School
Lomond
  Lomond Community School
Lundbreck
  Livingstone School

M
Magrath
  Magrath Junior Senior High School
Mallaig
  École Mallaig Community School
Ma-Me-O Beach
  Pigeon Lake Regional Storefront School
Manning
  Breaking Point Colony School
  Paul Rowe Junior Senior High School
Mannville
  Mannville School
Marwayne
  Marwayne Jubilee School
Maskwacis
  Ermineskin Ehpewapahk Alternate School
  Ermineskin Elementary Junior High School
  Maskwachees Cultural School
  Maskwacis Outreach School
  Nipisihkopahk Secondary School
Mayerthorpe
  Mayerthorpe Junior Senior High School
Medicine Hat
  Beyond Walls Outreach School
  Central High School
  Crescent Heights High School
  École Les Cypres
  Herald School
  Monsignor McCoy High School]
  Medicine Hat High School
  Palliser Adolescent Services (PAS)
  Saamis REAL Outreach
  YMCA Stay in School Career High School
  Young Moms' School
Milk River
  Erle Rivers High School
Mirror
  Living Truth Christian School
Monarch
  Providence Christian School
Morinville
  Kipohtakaw Education Centre
  Morinville Christian School
  Morinville Community High School
  Morinville Learning Center
Morley
  Morley Community School
Morrin
  Morrin School
Myrnam
  New Myrnam School

N
Nanton
  J. T. Foster School
Neerlandia
  Covenant Canadian Reformed School
New Norway
  New Norway School
New Sarepta
  New Sarepta Community High School
Nisku
  Black Gold Home-Based School
Nobleford
  Noble Central School
Nordegg
  Taotha School

O
Okotoks
  Cameron Crossing School
  Edison School
  Foothills Composite High School
  Holy Trinity Academy
  HUB Okotoks
  Okotoks Home Schooling
  St. Luke's Outreach Centre Okotoks
  Strathcona-Tweedsmuir School
  The Centre for Learning@HOME
Olds
  HOME Base
  Horizon Alternate Program
  Olds Career High School
  Olds Junior Senior High School
  Olds Koinonia Christian School
  Olds Mountain View Christian School
Onoway
  Onoway Junior Senior High School
  Onoway Outreach
Oyen
  South Central High School

P
Paddle Prairie
  Paddle Prairie School
Paradise Valley
  E. H. Walter School
Peace River
  Glenmary School
  Holy Family Cyberhigh Virtual School
  Peace Regional Outreach Campus
  Peace River High School
Peerless Lake
  Peerless Lake School
Picture Butte
  Picture Butte High School
  Picture Butte Outreach School
Pincher Creek
  Matthew Halton Community School
  Napi Outreach Center
  St. Michael's School
Plamondon
  École Beauséjour
  École Plamondon School
Ponoka
  Home Schooling
  Mamawi Atosketan Native School
  Ponoka Outreach School
  Ponoka Secondary Campus
  St. Augustine School
  Wolf Creek Education Centre
Provost
  Provost Public School
  St. Thomas Aquinas School

R
Rainbow Lake
  Rainbow Lake Learning Store
  Rainbow Lake School
Raymond
  Raymond High School
Red Deer
  Chinook's Edge Career High School-Red Deer Campus
  Community Programs
  Direwood Treatment Centre
  École Secondaire Notre Dame High School
  Gateway Christian School
  Hunting Hills High School
  St.John Paul II Catholic Outreach School
  Koinonia Christian School (Red Deer)
  Lindsay Thurber Comprehensive High School
  North Cottage High School
  Oskayak Treatment Centre
  Outreach School Centre
  Parkland School Special Education
  Parkland Youth Homes
  Quest High School
  Red Deer Regional Hospital Education Program
  St. Gabriel Cyber School
  Sunchild E-Learning Community
  Youth Assessment Centre
Red Earth Creek
  Clarence Jaycox School
  Red Earth Creek School
Redcliff
  Margaret Wooding School
Redwater
  Redwater School
Rimbey
  Rimbey Junior Senior High School
  West Country Outreach School
Rocky Mountain House
  Kootenay School
  O'Chiese School
  St. Dominic High School
  Sunchild First Nation School
  Visions West School
  West Central High School
Rolling Hills
  Rolling Hills School
Rosemary
  Rosemary School
Ryley
  Ryley School

S
Saddle Lake
  Kihew Asiniy Education Centre
  Saddle Lake Full Gospel School
Sedgewick
  Central High School Sedgwick
Sexsmith
  Horizon Group Care
  Sexsmith Secondary School
  St. Mary's Catholic School
Sherwood Park
  Archbishop Jordan Catholic High School
 Bev Facey Community High School
  EIPS Centre for Educational Alternatives
  EIPS Home Education
  Elk Island Youth Ranch Learning Centre
  Salisbury Composite (Evening)
  Salisbury Composite High School
  Sherwood Park Next Step I Outreach School
  Strathcona Christian Academy
Siksika
  Old Sun Community College
  Siksika Nation High School
  Siksika Storefront School
Slave Lake
  Lakeside Outreach School
  Roland Michener Secondary School
  Slave Lake Koinonia Chrn School
  St. Francis of Assisi Catholic Academy
  St. Mary's Outreach
Smith
  Smith School
Smoky Lake
  H. A. Kostash School
Spirit River
  Peace Academy of Virtual Education
  Peace Wapiti Outreach Program
  Savanna School
  Spirit River Regional Academy
Spruce Grove
  Evergreen Catholic Outreach School
  Harvest Baptist Academy
  Living Waters Christian Academy
  Spruce Grove Composite High School
  Spruce Grove Composite High School Outreach
  St. Peter the Apostle Catholic High School
Spruce View
  Spruce View School
St. Albert
  Bellerose Composite High School
  École Alexandre-Tach‚
  École Secondaire Sainte Marguerite d'Youville
  Paul Kane High School
  St. Albert Catholic High School
  St. Albert Public Outreach
  St. Albert Storefront School
  St. Gabriel Cyber School
St. Paul
  École du Sommet
  École Regionale St. Paul Regional High School
  St. Paul Alternate Education Centre
  St. Paul Store Front Campus
Stand Off
  Blood Tribe Youth Ranch Alternate High School
  Kainai Adolescent Treatment Centre
  Kainai Alternate Academy
Standard
  Standard School
Stettler
  Stettler Outreach School
  William E. Hay Composite High School
Stirling
  Stirling School
Stony Plain
  Connections for Learning:  High Park School
  Memorial Composite High School
  Memorial Composite High School Outreach
Strathmore
  Britestone Hutterite Colony
  Golden Hills Learning Academy
  Holy Cross Collegiate
  Huxley Colony School
  New Springvale School
  Rosebud River School
  Strathmore High School
  Strathmore Store Front School
  Three Hills Colony School
  Twin Creeks School
  Valleyview Colony School
Sturgeon County
  Sturgeon Composite High School
Sundre
  Sundre High School
  Sundre Learning Centre
Swan Hills
  Swan Hills School
Sylvan Lake
  École H. J. Cody High School
  Lighthouse Christian School
  Sylvan Lake Career High School

T
Taber
  ACE Place Learning Centre
  Armada Colony School
  Cameron Farms School
  Copperfield Farms Colony School
  Enchant Colony School
  Hillridge Colony School
  Kingsland Colony School
  Lomond Colony School
  St. Mary's Roman Catholic Separate School
  Tween Valley Christian School
  W. R. Myers High School
Thorhild
  Thorhild Central School
Thorsby
  Thorsby Junior Senior High School
Three Hills
  Prairie Christian Academy
  Three Hills School
Tofield
  Northstar Outreach
  Tofield School
Trochu
  Trochu Valley Outreach School
  Trochu Valley School
Trout Lake
  Kateri School
Tsuu T'ina Sarcee
  Tsuu T'ina Junior Senior High School
Two Hills
  Hairy Hill Colony School
  Two Hills Mennonite School
  Two Hills School

V
Valleyview
  Hillside Junior Senior High School
  Northern Gateway Division Outreach Program
  Valleyview Ranches Colony School
Vauxhall
  Horizon MAP School
  Vauxhall Junior Senior High School
Vegreville
  St Mary's Catholic High School
  Vegreville Composite High Scholl
  Vegreville Next Step III Outreach School
Vermilion
  Home Schooling Program
  J. R. Robson School
  School of Hope
  St Jerome's School
  Vermilion Outreach School
Viking
  Viking School
Vilna
  Vilna Off-Campus Achievement Academy
  Vilna School
Vulcan
  County Central High School
  Vulcan Outreach Program

W
Wabasca
  Chipewyan Lake School
  Mistassiniy Outreach Program
  Mistassiniy School
Wainwright
  Blessed Sacrament Outreach School
  Blessed Sacrament School
  École Saint-Christophe
  Wainwright High School
Wanham
  Birch Hills Hutterite School
  Shady Lane Colony School
Warburg
  Warburg School
Warner
  Warner School
Westlock
  Richard F. Staples Secondary School
  St Mary Catholic School
  Westlock Outreach
Wetaskiwin
  Pine Haven School
  Wetaskiwin Composite High School
  Wetaskiwin Home Education School
  Wetaskiwin Off-Campus Storefront
Whitecourt
  Hilltop Outreach
  St. Joseph School
Worsley
  Worsley Central School

Y
Youngstown
  Youngstown School

See also
 Lists of schools in Canada

References
 

Alberta

Schools